The Eastern Mediterranean conifer-sclerophyllous-broadleaf forests, also known as the Eastern Mediterranean conifer-broadleaf forests, is an ecoregion in the eastern Mediterranean Basin. It covers portions of Turkey, Syria, Iraq, Lebanon,  Israel, Palestinian territories, Jordan, and Saudi Arabia.

The ecoregion has a Mediterranean climate, and is part of the Mediterranean forests, woodlands, and scrub biome.

Geography
In southern Turkey, it occupies the coastal lowlands between the mountains and the Mediterranean, extending from Antalya to Iskenderun and including the Çukurova plain in between. It then extends eastwards through southern Turkey to where the borders of Iraq, Syria, and Turkey meet, and southwards along the eastern Mediterranean through the Levant 
– western Syria, Palestine, Lebanon, and the Jordanian Highlands. The Druze Mountains in central Syria are an outlier. Isolated mountaintop pockets (Jabal al-Lawz, etc.) are found in the Midian Mountains and Hijaz Mountains of northwestern Saudi Arabia.

The ecoregion is bounded by forest ecoregions to the north in Anatolia, and deserts to the east and south. The ecoregion covers coastal plains, low mountains, and interior plateaus. The higher elevations in the Taurus Mountains to the north, and the Syrian Coastal Mountains, Lebanon Mountains, and Anti-Lebanon Mountains which run parallel to the Eastern Mediterranean coast, are in the Southern Anatolian montane conifer and deciduous forests ecoregion.

Several large cities are in the ecoregion, including Adana, Gaziantep, Antalya, and Mersin in Turkey; Aleppo, Homs, Hama, and Latakia in Syria; Beirut and Tripoli in Lebanon; Tel Aviv, Jerusalem, and Haifa in Israel; Gaza, Hebron and Nablus in Palestinian territories; and Amman in Jordan.

Climate
The ecoregion has a Mediterranean climate, with a mild, rainy winter and hot dry summer. Rainfall varies across the ecoregion. It is generally higher on coastal-facing slopes, ranging from 1,000-1,250 mm annually near Antalya to 650-850 mm in Mersin, Adana, Iskendurun, and coastal Syria and Lebanon. Rainfall is lowest in the eastern and southernmost parts of the ecoregion, with less than 450 mm annually in eastern Anatolia, the interior of Syria, southern Israel and Palestinian territories, and the Jordanian Highlands.

Flora
Major plant communities in the ecoregion include broadleaf sclerophyllous shrublands (maquis and garrigue), pine forests (chiefly of Turkish pine (Pinus brutia) and Aleppo pine (Pinus halepensis)), and dry oak (Quercus spp.) woodlands and steppes.

Turkish pine is more common in the Turkish coastal region, and Aleppo pine in the Levant. Neither pine is found naturally in the eastern Mesopotamian part of the ecoregion.

Maquis is found on coastal slopes in southern Anatolia and along the Levantine coast. Maquis is an open-canopied evergreen woodland, with an understory of shrubs, herbs, grasses, and geophytes. The predominant trees are olive (Olea europea), carob (Cerotonia siliqua), Palestine oak (Quercus calliprinos, sometimes classified as Q. coccifera subsp. calliprinos), pistacio (Pistacia terebinthus, sometimes classified as P. palaestina), lentisk (P. lenticus), and Arbutus andrachne. Much of the maquis has been degraded by frequent fires and over-grazing.

The eastern and southernmost portions of the ecoregion are mostly low shrubland and grassland with a semi-desert character.

Fauna
The golden jackal (Canis aureus) has become the top predator in most of the ecoregion. The Caracal (Caracal caracal) can be found in the shrublands and mountains, and wild boar (Sus scrofa) in woodlands and forests. The eastern portion of the ecoregion has scattered populations of striped hyaena (Hyaena hyaena) and Persian gazelle (Gazella subgutturosa).

The large predators lion (Panthera leo), Syrian brown bear (Ursus arctos syriacus), wolf (Canis lupus), and cheetah (Acinonyx jubatus) have been mostly or completely extirpated from over-hunting and habitat loss.

Protected areas
A 2017 assessment found that 1,147 km², or less than 1%, of the ecoregion is in protected areas. Another 1% of the ecoregion had relatively intact habitat but is outside protected areas.

Some protected areas include:
 Mount Carmel National Park in Israel
 Mount Meron Nature Reserve in Israel (80.96 km²)
 Yumurtalık Lagoon Nature Reserve in Turkey (198.53 km²)

External links

References

Eastern Mediterranean
Ecoregions of Asia
Ecoregions of Israel
Ecoregions of Jordan
Ecoregions of Lebanon
Ecoregions of Saudi Arabia
Ecoregions of Syria
Ecoregions of Turkey
Ecoregions of the Mediterranean Basin
Mediterranean forests, woodlands, and scrub
Palearctic ecoregions
 
Ecoregions of Iraq
Sclerophyll forests